Aurlus Mabélé (24 October 1953 – 19 March 2020) was a Congolese singer and composer. He was commonly referred to as the "King of Soukous".

Biography
Aurlus Mabélé, real name Benoit Aurélien Miatsonama,  was born on 24 October 1953 in Brazzaville in the Poto-Poto district in the Republic of Congo.

In 1974, he founded, notably with Jean Baron, Pedro Wapechkado and Mav Cacharel, the group Les Ndimbola Lokole.

Having left the Congo to improve in Europe, he founded, in 1986, with Diblo Dibala and Mav Cacharel, the Loketo group. He then created the soukous of which he would be proclaimed "king", hence the slogan "It is Aurlus Mabele the new king of the soukous".

In 25 years of career, he has sold more than 10 million albums in the world and has contributed to making the soukous known outside the African continent.

Suffering from the consequences of a stroke for five years, he organized with the group Loketo successful concerts in the West Indies between May and June 2009.

Accompanied by talented guitarists, he made the whole of Africa dance to music with its typical soukous rhythms (Africa Mousso, La Femme ivoirienne, Embargo, Betty, Asta De, Evelyne, Loketo, etc.).

Illness and death
Aurlus Mabélé had been in and out of hospitals in Paris since suffering a stroke. His health had been weak and was partially paralyzed.

Fellow musician Nyboma Mwan'dido, while on tour in Kenya, broke the news of Mabélé's sickness to Kenyans and asked his fans to pray for him. At one point of the show he played Mabélé's song as a tribute. Mabélé was diagnosed with throat cancer and had battled the disease for about 5 years.

Mabélé was admitted to hospital in Eaubonne on 19 March 2020 and died there the same night. The news of his death was later confirmed via Social media (Twitter) by his daughter Liza Monet. Reacting to the news of his death, many musicians and fans eulogized him as a musician and a composer who was good at his craft. His long time guitar wizard Dally Kimoko remembered him for the long years he had worked with him since he replaced Diblo Dibala on guitar in the band Loketo.

Discography 

 1988: Maracas d'or
 1989: Soukouss la terreur (Melody) CD 41007-2
 1990: Embargo (Melody)
 1992: Stop Arretez ! 1992 (JIP) CD 41021 2
 1994: Génération-Wachiwa encaisse tout (JIP) CD 41032 2
 1996: Album 1996 (Melody) CD 41041 2
 1997: Album 1997 (Melody)
 1997: Best of Aurlus Mabele (Melody) CD 41044 2
 1998: Proteine 4 (JIP)
 1998: Tour de contrôle (JPS Production)
 1999: Compil one (DEBS Music)
 1999: Compil two (DEBS Music)
 2000: Dossier X JPS Production
 Sebene
 Africa mousso
 La Femme ivoirienne
 Réconciliation/cicatrice, by Loketo
 Confirmation, by Loketo

References

1953 births
2020 deaths
Republic of the Congo musicians
People from Brazzaville
Deaths from the COVID-19 pandemic in France
20th-century male singers
20th-century composers
21st-century male singers
21st-century composers